The 1979 LPGA Championship was the 25th LPGA Championship, played June 7–10 at Jack Nicklaus Golf Center at Kings Island in Mason, Ohio, a suburb northeast of Cincinnati.

Donna Caponi Young won the first of her two LPGA Championships, three strokes ahead of runner-up Jerilyn Britz. It was the third of her four major titles; her previous major win was nine years earlier.

Past champions in the field

Made the cut

Source:

Missed the cut

Source:

Final leaderboard
Sunday, June 10, 1979

Source:

References

External links
Golf Observer leaderboard
The Golf Center at Kings Island

Women's PGA Championship
Golf in Ohio
LPGA Championship
LPGA Championship
LPGA Championship
LPGA Championship
Women's sports in Ohio